Jeon Min-Jae(Korean:전민재) (born 12 July 1977) is a Paralympian athlete from South Korea competing mainly in category T36 sprint events.

Jeon first competed at a Paralympics in Beijing in 2008, where she entered both the 100m and 200m sprints, finishing 6th and 4th respectively. Four years later at the 2012 Summer Paralympics in London, she won silver in the 100m and 200m finals, finishing behind Russia's Elena Sviridova in both. As well as her Paralympic success Jeon has won medals at both World Championships and the Asian Para Games.

Personal history
Jeon was born in South Korea in 1977. At the age of five she suffered from encephalitis, which resulted in her acquiring cerebral palsy.

Notes

External links 
 

1977 births
Living people
South Korean female sprinters
Paralympic athletes of South Korea
Paralympic silver medalists for South Korea
Athletes (track and field) at the 2008 Summer Paralympics
Athletes (track and field) at the 2012 Summer Paralympics
Medalists at the 2012 Summer Paralympics
Medalists at the 2016 Summer Paralympics
Paralympic medalists in athletics (track and field)
Athletes (track and field) at the 2020 Summer Paralympics